The 2014 Brisbane Broncos season was the 27th in the club's history. Coached by Anthony Griffin and co-captained by Justin Hodges and Corey Parker, they competed in the NRL's 2014 Telstra Premiership, finishing the regular season eighth (out of sixteen) to make it into the finals. The Broncos were then knocked out of contention in the first game of the finals against the North Queensland Cowboys.

Season summary
On 10 January, Sam Thaiday announced he was standing down from the Broncos captaincy. Thaiday had captained the Broncos since 2012 when he took over the captaincy from the retired Darren Lockyer. Justin Hodges and Corey Parker were named the club's new co-captains.

On 21 July, Coach Anthony Griffin was informed his services would not be required in 2015. Griffin agreed to see out the remainder of the 2014 season. When asked by the media what he said to the players, Griffin said "I told them I got the arse". At the time of his sacking Griffin had a coaching record of 51 wins from 93 games.

Later the same day, it was announced that Wayne Bennett had signed a three-year deal to coach the Broncos from 2015. Bennett is the inaugural coach of the Broncos having coached them from 1988 to 2008.

Milestones
Round 1: Ben Barba, Martin Kennedy, Todd Lowrie and Daniel Vidot made their debuts for the club
Round 3: Ben Barba played his 100th career game
Round 5: Corey Parker scored his 1000th career point
Round 11: Ben Hunt played his 100th game for the club
Round 11: Francis Molo made his first grade debut
Round 12: Josh Hoffman and Josh McGuire played their 100th game for the club
Round 12: Dale Copley played his 50th game for the club
Round 15: Jake Granville scored his 1st career try
Round 18: Sam Thaiday played his 200th game for the club
Round 20: Todd Lowrie played his 200th career game
Round 21: Matt Gillett played his 100th game for the club
Round 24: Daniel Vidot played his 100th career game

Squad List

Squad Movement

Gains

Losses

Re-signings

Contract lengths

Ladder

Fixtures

Pre-season

NRL Auckland Nines

The NRL Auckland Nines is a pre-season rugby league nines competition featuring all 16 NRL clubs. The 2014 competition was played over two days on 15 and 16 February at Eden Park in Auckland, New Zealand. The Broncos featured in Pool Green and played the Bulldogs, Eels and Roosters. The top two teams of each pool qualified for the quarter finals.

Pool Play

Finals

Regular season

Finals

Statistics

Source:

Representatives
The following players have played a representative match in 2014

Honours

League
Nil

Club
Paul Morgon Medal: Ben Hunt
Player's Player: Ben Hunt
Fan Player of the Year: Ben Hunt
Best Back: Ben Hunt
Best Forward: Josh McGuire
Most Consistent: Alex Glenn
Clubman of the Year: Scot Czislowski
NYC Player of the Year: Joe Ofahengaue

References

Brisbane Broncos seasons
Brisbane Broncos season